Unio is a genus of medium-sized freshwater mussels, aquatic bivalve mollusks in the family Unionidae, the river mussels. They are found throughout Europe, Africa, and the Middle East, with some species introduced to East Asia. Fossil species are also known from the Jurassic of North America.

Unio is the type genus of the family Unionidae.

Species
Species in the genus Unio include:
Unio abyssinicus Martens, 1866
Unio bruguierianus Bourguignat, 1853
Unio caffer Krauss, 1848
Unio cariei - extinct (no longer recognised)
Unio courtillieri Hattemann, 1859
Unio crassus Philipsson, 1788 (Thick shelled river mussel) - near threatened
Unio damascensis Lea, 1863
Unio delicatus Lea, 1863
Unio delphinus Spengler, 1793
Unio dembeae Reeve, 1865
Unio durieui Deshayes, 1847
Unio elongatulus C. Pfeiffer, 1825
Unio eucirrus Bourguignat, 1857
Unio foucauldianus Pallary, 1936
Unio gibbus Spengler, 1793
Unio hueti Bourguignat, 1855
Unio ionicus Drouët, 1879
Unio mancus Lamarck, 1819
 Unio meridionalis Drouët, 1883
Unio pictorum (Linnaeus, 1758) (Painter's mussel)
Unio ravoisieri Deshayes, 1848 
Unio sesirmensis Kobelt, 1913
Unio terminalis Bourguignat, 1852
Unio tigridis Bourguignat, 1852
Unio tumidiformis Castro, 1885 
Unio tumidus Philipsson, 1788 (Swollen river mussel)
Unio turtoni (=Unio mancus)

References

External links
 

 
Bivalve genera